

Wiljani Conservation Park is a protected area in the Australian state of South Australia in the gazetted locality of Mount Pleasant located about  north-west of the town centre in Mount Pleasant.

It was proclaimed under the National Parks and Wildlife Act 1972 on 25 February 2016 in respect to a parcel of land in the cadastral unit of the Hundred of Para Wirra. The proclaimed land is not subject to access rights under the Mining Act 1971 or the Petroleum and Geothermal Energy Act 2000.

Wiljani is a clan name, i.e. a family group, belonging to the  Peramangk aboriginal people who traditionally lived on the land within the vicinity of what is now the conservation park. The name was selected during 2015 after a process of “consultation and approval” involving the Peramangk people and the Department of Environment, Water and Natural Resources

The conservation park is classified as an IUCN Category VI protected area.

See also
Protected areas of South Australia

References

External links
Webpage for the Wiljani Conservation Park on the vk5pas amateur radio website

Conservation parks of South Australia
Protected areas established in 2016
2016 establishments in Australia